Mary Our Queen is a Roman Catholic Marian prayer.

It is attributed to Saint Anthony of Padua in the 13th century.

Words of the prayer
Mary, our Queen,
Holy Mother of God,
we beg you to hear our prayer.
Make our hearts overflow with Divine grace
and resplendent with heavenly wisdom.
Render them strong with your might
and rich in virtue.
Pour down upon us the gift of mercy
so that we may obtain the pardon of our sins.
Help us to live in such a way
as to merit the glory and bliss of heaven.
May this be granted us by your Son Jesus
Who has exalted you above the angels,
has crowned you as Queen,
and has seated you with Him
forever on his refulgent throne.

Amen

See also

 The Glories of Mary
 Queen of Heaven
 Queen of Angels Foundation

References
 University of Dayton 
 Catholic Doors

External links 
 The Queen of Angels Foundation

Marian devotions
Roman Catholic prayers